Boris Aleksandrovich Kazakov (born November 6, 1940 in Kuibyshev; died November 25, 1978 in Kuibyshev) was a Soviet football player. He died when he tried to drive his car over the ice-covered river and the ice broke, drowning the car with him in it.

Honours
 Soviet Top League bronze: 1964, 1965.
 Top 33 year-end list: once.
 Grigory Fedotov club member.

International career
Kazakov made his debut for USSR on May 16, 1965 in a friendly against Austria. He played in 1966 FIFA World Cup qualifiers (scoring a goal against Greece), but was not selected for the final tournament squad.

External links
  Profile

1940 births
1978 deaths
Soviet footballers
Soviet Union international footballers
Soviet football managers
Soviet Top League players
PFC Krylia Sovetov Samara players
PFC CSKA Moscow players
Russian footballers
FC Lada-Tolyatti managers
Road incident deaths in the Soviet Union
Deaths by drowning
Association football forwards